Clathrodrillia marissae is a species of sea snail, a marine gastropod mollusc in the family Drilliidae.

Description
The length of the shell attains the length of 37 mm.

Distribution
This marine species occurs in the Atlantic Ocean off Grand Bahama.

References

 Fallon P.J. (2016). Taxonomic review of tropical western Atlantic shallow water Drilliidae (Mollusca: Gastropoda: Conoidea) including descriptions of 100 new species. Zootaxa. 4090(1): 1–363

External links
 

.

marissae
Gastropods described in 2016